Alex Burks may refer to:
Alex Burke (born 1977), Scottish footballer
Alexandra Burke (born 1988), English singer
Alec Burks (born 1991), American basketball player

See also
Ellis Burks (born 1964), American baseball player